Evelyn Haswell "Has" Catley (23 September 1915 – 23 March 1975) was a New Zealand rugby union player. A hooker, Catley represented Waikato at a provincial level, and was a member of the New Zealand national side, the All Blacks, from 1946 to 1949. He played 21 matches for the All Blacks including seven internationals.  Catley went on to be co-coach and later selector of the Waikato team.

References

1915 births
1975 deaths
Rugby union players from Hamilton, New Zealand
People educated at King's College, Auckland
Rugby union hookers
Waikato rugby union players
New Zealand rugby union players
New Zealand international rugby union players
New Zealand rugby union coaches